Jason DesJarlais is an American football scout and former player and coach. He is a regional scout for the Jacksonville Jaguars of the National Football League (NFL). DesJarlais served as the interim head football coach at the University of San Diego for the final three games of the 2003 season following the firing of Kevin McGarry.

DesJarlais played college football at Western Montana College—now known as the University of Montana Western.

Head coaching record

Notes

References

External links
 Jacksonville Jaguars profile

Year of birth missing (living people)
Living people
American football defensive linemen
Bates Bobcats football coaches
Jacksonville Jaguars scouts
Humboldt State Lumberjacks football coaches
Montana Western Bulldogs football coaches
Montana Western Bulldogs football players
San Diego Toreros football coaches
Yale Bulldogs football coaches